Dream  is an upcoming South Korean sports comedy-drama film written and directed by Lee Byeong-heon, starring Park Seo-joon and Lee Ji-eun. It revolves around Yoon Hong-dae, a football player, who receives disciplinary provision and is given the challenging job of coaching the national football team of homeless people for the Homeless World Cup. It is scheduled to be released theatrically on April 26, 2023.

Synopsis
After football player Hong-dae (Park Seo-joon) is involved in an unexpected incident and receives disciplinary probation, he is appointed the coach for a special national soccer team. The team consists of homeless people who have never even held a ball before, and will compete in the Homeless World Cup.

Cast

Main
 Park Seo-joon as Yoon Hong-dae, a football coach.
 Lee Ji-eun as Lee So-min, an aspiring director, who is making a documentary about the team

Supporting
 Kim Jong-soo as Kim Hwan-dong
 Ko Chang-seok as Jeon Hyo-bong
 Jung Seung-gil as Son Beom-soo
 Lee Hyun-woo as Kim In-sun
 Yang Hyun-min as Jeon Moon-soo
 Hong Ahn-pyo as Young-jin
 Heo Joon-seok as Hwang In-guk, the secretary general of the club
 Lee Ha-nui as Byeong-sam
 Baek Ji-won as Sun-ja (Hong-dae's mother)

Special appearance
 Kang Ha-neul

Production

Casting 
In January 2020, Park Seo-joon was cast to play Yoon Hong-dae, a football player-turned-coach. In January 2020, IU was confirmed to star alongside Park. Park prepared for his role by going to the gym.

Filming 
Principal photography began on May 7, 2020. In October 2020, the production team wrapped up filming in South Korea. Additional scenes were scheduled to be filmed in Hungary or Colombia, depending on the COVID-19 situation. Foreign locale shooting of the film were then postponed to 2022 due to post COVID-19 complications and working schedule of actors.

On February 8, 2022, it was reported that the actors and staff of Dream would start filming overseas in Europe in March. Later, director Lee Byung-hun flew to Europe and toured the filming location. On March 3, 2022, it was reported that Park Seo-joon flew to Hungary for the shooting of the film.

Filming wrapped on April 13, 2022, in Hungary. Commenting on post-production work, director Lee Byung-hun said, "I will do my best to complete the rest of the post-production work so that the feelings we wanted to convey through this film can be conveyed to the audience."

References

External links
 
 
 
 

Upcoming films
South Korean comedy-drama films
2020s Korean-language films
South Korean sports drama films
Film productions suspended due to the COVID-19 pandemic
Films shot in Hungary